TrSS St Andrew was a passenger vessel built for the Great Western Railway in 1908.

History

TrSS St Andrew was built by John Brown to augment the three new ships of 1906, the TrSS St David, TrSS St George and the TrSS St Patrick acquired for the Fishguard to Rosslare service.

In 1910 she was in a heavy sea on a voyage between Fishguard and Douglas, and a member of crew, Thomas O’Neill of Waterford was thrown overboard and drowned.

During the First World War she was used as a hospital ship. In 1932 she was renamed Fishguard, to free up her name for a replacement TSS St Andrew, and was scrapped in 1933.

References

1908 ships
Passenger ships of the United Kingdom
Steamships of the United Kingdom
Ships built on the River Clyde
Ships of the Great Western Railway